Shri is a Sanskrit term denoting resplendence, wealth and prosperity, primarily used as an honorific.

The word is widely used in South and Southeast Asian languages such as Marathi, Malay (including Indonesian and Malaysian), Javanese, Balinese, Sundanese, Sinhala, Thai, Tamil, Telugu, Hindi, Nepali, Malayalam, Kannada, Sanskrit, Pali, Khmer, and also among Philippine languages. It is usually transliterated as Sri, Sree, Shri, Shiri, Shree, Si, or Seri based on the local convention for transliteration.

The term is used in Indian subcontinent and Southeast Asia as a polite form of address equivalent to the English "Mr." in written and spoken language.

"Shri" is also used as a title of veneration for deities or as honorific title for individuals.

Shri is also another name for Lakshmi, the Hindu goddess of wealth, while a yantra or a mystical diagram popularly used to worship her is called Shri Yantra.

Etymology

Monier-Williams Dictionary gives the meaning of the root verb  as  "to cook, boil, to burn, diffuse light", but as a feminine abstract noun, it has received a general meaning of "grace, splendour, beauty; wealth, affluence, prosperity".

The word  may also be used as an adjective in Sanskrit, which is the origin of the modern use of shri as a title.  From the noun, is derived the Sanskrit adjective "śrīmat" (śrimān in the masculine nominative singular, śrīmatī in the feminine), by adding the suffix indicating possession, literally  "radiance-having" (person, god, etc.). This is used in modern vernacular as form of address Shrimati (abbreviated Smt) for married women, while Sushri, (with "su", "good", added to the beginning), can be used for women in general (regardless of marital status).

Spelling and pronunciation 
There are two conventions in India to transliterate the consonant  to English: some use s (which in narrower transcription represents only ) as in Sri Lanka and Srinagar, while others use sh as in Shimla and Shimoga. Similarly,  is also transliterated to English in two different ways as  ri and  ree, although the latter is non-standard in Hindi. Hence this word  may be rendered in English as Shri (the standard spelling), Shree, Sri or Sree; Some other transliterations used are Shri, Shiri, Shrii. Whatever the translitertion may be, its pronunciation remains the same.

Sanskrit is written in many other Indian scripts as well, each of which has its own equivalents of these Devanāgari letters; the Sanskrit pronunciation remains the same regardless of script.

Usage

Shri is a polite form of address equivalent to the English "Mr." or "Ms.".

Shri is also frequently used as an epithet of some Hindu gods, in which case it is often translated into English as Holy. Also, in language and general usage, Shri, if used by itself and not followed by any name, refers to the supreme consciousness, i.e. god.

Sridevi, also rendered Shri, is an epithet and name of Lakshmi, consort of Vishnu, the goddess of prosperity and wealth in Hinduism. The Vedas speak of Shri as a goddess, who personified ten qualities coveted by other divine beings: food, royalty, holiness, kingdom, fortune, sovereignty, nobility, power, righteousness, and beauty. The Vedic Shri is believed to have identified with later conceptions of Lakshmi, as the embodiment of royalty and dignity.

Shri is one of the names of Ganesha, the Hindu god of prosperity.

Shri is also used as a title of the Hindu deities Rāma, Krishna, Saraswati and sometimes Durgā.

Repetition

Shri may be repeated depending on the status of the person.

 Shri: for anybody
 Shri 2: honorific, guru, e.g. Ravi Shankar, Abhi Joshi
 Shri 3: title used by former hereditary Prime Ministers of Nepal (example- Mohan Shamsher Jang Bahadur Rana)
 Shri 4: title used by Divine factor, e.g. Afactor Abinash
 Shri 5: title used by former Maharajadhiraja (e.g. Shri pānch ko sarkār, His Majesty's Government, where ko indicates genitive case (possessive, 'of His Majesty') 
 Shri 108: used by spiritual leaders
 Shri 1008: used by spiritual leaders (e.g. Shri 1008 Satyatma Tirtha)

Other current usage
There is a common practice of writing Shri as the first word centralised in line at the beginning of a document.

During the Vidyāraṃbhaṃ ceremony, the mantra "Om hari shri ganapataye namah" is written in sand or in a tray of rice grains by a child, under the supervision of a Guru or Priest.

Another usage is as an emphatic compound (which can be used several times: shri shri, or shri shri shri, etc.) in princely styles, notably in Darbar Shri, Desai Shri, and Thakur Shri or Shrii Shrii Anandamurti, the founder of the social and spiritual movement Ananda Marga (the Path of Bliss).

The honorific can also be applied to objects and concepts that are widely respected, such as the Sikh religious text, the Shri Guru Granth Sahib. Similarly, when the Ramlila tradition of reenacting the Ramayana is referred to as an institution, the term Shri Ramlila is frequently used.

Indian music
The use of the term is common in the names of ragas (musical motifs), either as a prefix or postfix. Some examples are Shree, Bhagyashree, Dhanashree, Jayashree, Subhashree, Itishree, Jiteshree, and Shree ranjani.

Other languages

South and Southeast Asia

Place names
The honorific is incorporated into many place names. A partial list follows:
 Sriharikota, India
Srimangal, Bangladesh
Srisailam, Andhra Pradesh, a Siva temple, also one of the holiest places of worship for Hindus.
Srikakulam, a town in northern Andhra Pradesh.
Sri City, an integrated township located on the Andhra Pradesh and Tamil Nadu border.
Shri Kshetra, name of the Puri Jagannath Dham, Odisha. One of the four Dhams in the Hindu religion.
 Sree Mandira is a famous Hindu temple dedicated to Jagannath (Krishna) and located in the coastal town of Puri in Odisha.
 Sri Lanka, an island country at the southern tip of India.
 Sri Perumbudur, a town in the state of Tamil Nadu
 Sri Rangam, an island zone in the city of Tiruchirapalli, in Tamil Nadu.
 Srinagar, nagar meaning "city", is the capital of the Union territory of Jammu and Kashmir
 Sri Jayawardenapura Kotte, the administrative capital of Sri Lanka.
 Sri Maha Bodhi, a sacred fig tree in the Mahamewna Gardens, Anuradhapura, Sri Lanka.
 Srivijaya, a former kingdom centered on Sumatra, Indonesia.
 Sriwijaya University, located in South Sumatra, Indonesia
 Sri, pronounced and usually transliterated Si in Thailand place names:
Phra Nakhon Si Ayutthaya, formal name of the city and province of Ayutthaya
Nakhon Si Thammarat city and province
Sisaket city and province
 Wat Si Saket in Vientiane, Laos.
 Bandar Seri Begawan, the capital of Brunei.
 Seri Menanti, the royal town of Negeri Sembilan, Malaysia.
 Banteay Srei, a 10th-century Hindu temple in Angkor, Cambodia
 Srey Santhor, a district located in Kampong Cham, Cambodia.

See also

 Indian honorifics
 Shrimati
 Thai honorifics
 Thai royal ranks and titles
 Malay styles and titles
 Filipino styles and honorifics
 Indonesian honorifics
 Sinhala honorifics
 Greater India

References

Titles in India
Honorifics
Prefixes
Lakshmi